The Flag Party  is a Salafist political party in Egypt. It was founded in 2013 and is headed by Hazem Salah Abu Ismail.

References

2013 establishments in Egypt
Conservative parties in Egypt
Islamic political parties in Egypt
Political parties established in 2013
Political parties in Egypt
Salafi Islamist groups